A pulmonary shunt is the passage of deoxygenated blood from the right side of the heart to the left without participation in gas exchange in the pulmonary capillaries. It is a pathological condition that results when the alveoli of parts of the lungs are perfused with blood as normal, but ventilation (the supply of air) fails to supply the perfused region.  In other words, the ventilation/perfusion ratio (the ratio of air reaching the alveoli to blood perfusing them) of those areas is zero.

A pulmonary shunt often occurs when the alveoli fill with fluid, causing parts of the lung to be unventilated although they are still perfused.

Intrapulmonary shunting is the main cause of hypoxemia (inadequate blood oxygen) in pulmonary edema and conditions such as pneumonia in which the lungs become consolidated.  The shunt fraction is the percentage of cardiac output that is not completely oxygenated.

In pathological conditions such as pulmonary contusion, the shunt fraction is significantly greater and even breathing 100% oxygen does not fully oxygenate the blood.

Intrapulmonary shunt is specifically shunting where some of the blood flow through the lungs is not properly oxygenated. Other shunts may occur where venous and arterial blood mix but completely bypass the lungs (extrapulmonary shunt).

Anatomical shunt
If every alveolus was perfectly ventilated and all blood from the right ventricle were to pass through fully functional pulmonary capillaries, and there was unimpeded diffusion across the alveolar and capillary membrane, there would be a theoretical maximum blood gas exchange, and the alveolar PO2 and arterial PO2 would be the same. The formula for shunt describes deviation from this ideal.

A normal lung is imperfectly ventilated and perfused, and a small degree of intrapulmonary shunting is normal. Anatomical shunting occurs when blood supply to the lungs via the pulmonary arteries is returned via the pulmonary veins without passing through the pulmonary capillaries, thereby bypassing alveolar gas exchange. Capillary shunting is blood that passes through capillaries of unventilated alveoli or deoxygenated blood flowing directly from pulmonary arterioles to nearby pulmonary veins through anastomoses, bypassing the alveolar capillaries. In addition, some of the smallest cardiac veins drain directly into the left ventricle of the human heart. This drainage of deoxygenated blood straight into the systemic circulation is why the arterial PO2 is normally slightly lower than the alveolar PO2, known as the alveolar–arterial gradient, a useful clinical sign in determining the cause of hypoxia.

Pathophysiology

An irregular distribution of ventilation can occur in asthma, bronchiolitis, atelectasis, and other conditions, which  have the effect of reducing the amount of oxygen present in some alveoli relative to others. If the normal perfusion of these alveoli were to persist, the blood in those regions would be less oxygenated than blood in the normally ventilated alveioli, and the combined blood oxygenation after mixing would be lower than normal.  A pulmonary shunt occurs when this imbalance is undercompensated. The normal response of pulmonary blood vessels sensing a low oxygen saturation is to constrict, slowing the flow through the underoxygenated areas, thereby giving it time to increase saturation and increasing relative flow through those areas with more effective oxygenation, resulting in a higher combined oxygenation. If there is no oxygen available in the alveoli, the blood cannot be oxygenated and any blood flowing through such areas of the lung is considered an intrapulmonary shunt.

While in a pulmonary shunt, the ventilation/perfusion ratio is zero, lung units with a V/Q (where V = ventilation, and Q = perfusion) ratio of less than 0.005 are indistinguishable from shunt from a gas exchange perspective.

When alveoli fill with fluid, they are unable to participate in gas exchange with blood, causing local or regional hypoxia, thus triggering vasoconstriction. This vasoconstriction is triggered by a smooth muscle reflex, as a consequence of the low oxygen concentration itself. Blood is then redirected away from this area, which poorly matches ventilation and perfusion, to areas which are being ventilated.

A decrease in perfusion relative to ventilation (as occurs in pulmonary embolism, for example) is an example of increased dead space. Dead space is a space where gas exchange does not take place, such as the trachea; it is ventilation without perfusion. A pathological example of dead zone would be a capillary blocked by an embolus. Although ventilation at that area is unaffected, blood will not be able to flow through that capillary; therefore, at that zone there will be no gas exchange. Dead zones may be corrected by supplying 100% inspired oxygen; when a capillary is blocked, the blood inside of it does not flow and upstream blood distributes between other capillaries that are exchanging gases effectively. The resulting blood that flows through them will not be 100% saturated, as it contains some unoxygenated blood (the one that came from the blocked capillary). For this reason, blood will actually be able to obtain the extra oxygen supplied to the patient.

Pulmonary shunting causes the blood supply leaving a shunted area of the lung to have lower levels of oxygen and higher levels of carbon dioxide (i.e., the normal gas exchange does not occur).

A pulmonary shunt occurs as a result of blood flowing right-to-left through cardiac openings or in pulmonary arteriovenous malformations. The shunt which means V/Q = 0 for that particular part of the lung field under consideration results in de-oxygenated blood going to the heart from the lungs via the pulmonary veins.

If giving 100% oxygen for five to ten minutes doesn't raise the arterial tension of oxygen more than it does the alveolar pressure of oxygen then the defect in the lung is because of a pulmonary shunt. This is because although the oxygen partial pressure of alveolar gas has been changed by giving pure supplemental oxygen, the arterial gas oxygen concentration will not increase that much because the V/Q mismatch still exists and it will still add some de-oxygenated blood to the arterial system via the shunt.

See also
 Shunt equation
 Cardiac shunt
 Shunt (medical)

References

External links
 

Respiratory physiology